Manev is a Bulgarian masculine surname, its feminine counterpart is Maneva. It may refer to

Emanuil Manev (born 1992), Bulgarian football player
Evdokiya Maneva (born 1945), Bulgarian politician
Georgi Manev (1884–1965), Bulgarian physicist
Ivan Manev (born 1950), Bulgarian sprint canoer
Kole Manev (born 1941), Macedonian painter and film director
Milka Maneva (born 1985), Bulgarian weightlifter
Slavka Maneva (1934–), Macedonian writer and poet
Tzvetana Maneva (born 1944), Bulgarian actress
Yulian Manev (born 1966), Bulgarian football player

Bulgarian-language surnames